Roads in Ghana form a network of varied quality and capacity. Responsibility for the road network differs between trunk and non-trunk routes. Trunk roads, which are the most important roads, are administered by the Ghana Highway Authority, which was established in 1974 to develop the trunk road network. Ghana's 13,367 km of trunk roads accounts for 33% of the total road network of 40,186 km.  The Department of Feeder Roads is responsible for the construction and maintenance of feeder roads in Ghana, while responsibility for urban roads lies with the Department of Urban Roads. In the 18th and 19th centuries, the Ashanti Empire constructed a complex network of roads to link Kumasi with their territories in modern Ghana. For John Thornton, these roads improved transportation across the region by the 19th century.

Road distances are shown in kilometers and Ghana speed limits are indicated in kilometers per hour (km/h).

Classification
Trunk roads in Ghana are classified as N for National routes, R for Regional routes, and IR for Inter-Regional routes. Each road is given a number which is combined with the prefix, for example N1, R40 and IR11, although their informal or traditional names may still be used or heard occasionally: for instance the Accra - Kumasi Road (now part of the N6).

National routes
National routes in Ghana are a class of roads and highways that form the trunk routes between major urban centers. Together, they form the backbone of the road system. This category of roads is designated with the letter N followed by a number indicating the specific route.  Odd-numbered routes run east to west, while even-numbered routes run north to south.

List of routes
AS Ashanti Region, BA Brong-Ahafo Region, CR Central Region, ER Eastern Region, GR Greater Accra Region, NR Northern Region, UE Upper East Region, UW Upper West Region, VR Volta Region, WR Western Region

Inter-regional routes
Inter-Regional routes, designated with the prefix IR, connect major settlements and regional capitals across regional borders.  Running east to west are odd-numbered routes, while north-south routes are even-numbered.

List of routes
AS Ashanti Region, BA Brong-Ahafo Region, CR Central Region, ER Eastern Region, GR Greater Accra Region, NR Northern Region, UE Upper East Region, UW Upper West Region, VR Volta Region, WR Western Region

Regional routes
Regional routes are a mix of primary and secondary routes that link major settlements and serve as feeder roads to the National route network. Major regional routes are designated with the letter R followed by a two-digit number, while Minor regional routes are designated with the letter R followed by a three-digit number.

Designation as a Regional route does not imply that a road is maintained by a regional authority; some parts of the Regional route network are maintained by the Ghana Highway Authority, and parts in cities and towns may be ordinary streets maintained by the Department of Urban Roads and the Department of Feeder Roads. Regional routes vary in quality and size from dirt roads to multi-lane paved highways.

Major regional routes
Major regional routes are the second category of road in the Ghana trunk road network. They serve as feeder roads to the national route network, and are the primary trunk roads in areas where there is no national route.

List of routes
AS Ashanti Region, BA Brong-Ahafo Region, CR Central Region, ER Eastern Region, GR Greater Accra Region, NR Northern Region, UE Upper East Region, UW Upper West Region, VR Volta Region, WR Western Region

Minor regional routes
Minor Regional Routes are the third category of road in the Ghana trunk road network. They serve as feeder roads connecting smaller towns to the national and major regional route network.

List of routes
AS Ashanti Region, BA Brong-Ahafo Region, CR Central Region, ER Eastern Region, GR Greater Accra Region, NR Northern Region, UE Upper East Region, UW Upper West Region, VR Volta Region, WR Western Region

Signage

Signage on the Ghana network conforms broadly to international norms. All length distances are shown in kilometers, speed is in kilometers per hour, whilst height and width restrictions are shown in meters. Signs may be of an informative, warning or instructional nature. Instructional signs are generally circular, warnings are triangular, and informative signs are rectangular or square. Informative signs, which include directional signs, use white text on a blue background.

See also 
List of road interchanges in Ghana

References

External links
 Ghana Highway Authority
 Ministry of Transportation

Roads in Ghana